The International Bar Association (IBA), founded in 1947, is a bar association of international legal practitioners, bar associations and law societies. The IBA currently has a membership of more than 80,000 individual lawyers and 190 bar associations and law societies. Its global headquarters are located in London, England, and it has regional offices in Washington, D.C., United States, Seoul, South Korea and São Paulo, Brazil.

History of the IBA
Representatives of 34 national bar associations gathered in New York City, New York on 17 February 1947 to create the IBA. Initial membership was limited to bar associations and law societies, but in 1970, IBA membership was opened to individual lawyers. Members of the legal profession including barristers, advocates, solicitors,  members of the judiciary, in-house lawyers, government lawyers, academics and law students comprise the membership of the IBA.

Relationships with other international organisations
The IBA has held Special Consultative status before the UN General Assembly and the UN Economic and Social Council (ECOSOC) since 1947. On 9 October 2012, the IBA signed a memorandum of understanding with the Organisation for Economic Co-operation and Development (OECD). The IBA also partners with the OECD and United Nations Office on Drugs and Crime (UNODC) in the Anti-Corruption Strategy for the Legal Profession, an anti-corruption initiative for lawyers. The IBA has also partnered with other organisations including the International Federation of Accountants (IFAC) and the International Organisation of Employers (IOE).

Structure of the IBA 
The IBA is divided into two divisions – the Legal Practice Division (LPD) and the Public and Professional Interest Division (PPID). Each Division houses various committees and fora that are dedicated to specific practice areas. These committees and fora issue regular publications that focus on international legal practice.

The PPID houses the Bar Issues Commission (BIC) and Human Rights Institute (IBAHRI). The BIC was established in 2004 and consists of representatives from bar associations and law societies around the world. IBAHRI was established in 1995 under the honorary presidency of Nelson Mandela.

The current Executive Director of the IBA is Mark Ellis.

Human Rights Institute (IBAHRI) 
The International Bar Association's Human Rights Institute (IBAHRI) was established in 1995 under the honorary presidency of Nelson Mandela. The mission statement of the IBAHRI is "to promote, protect and enforce human rights under a just rule of law". IBAHRI undertakes a variety of projects in the field of human rights and rule of law, particularly concerning the independence of the judiciary and fair trial rights.

Codes and guidance on legal practice
The IBA issues codes and guidance on international legal practice. The IBA Rules on the Taking of Evidence in International Arbitration, adopted in 1999 and revised in 2010, are used by parties in international commercial arbitration.

The IBA has also issued: IBA Guidelines on Conflicts of Interest in International Arbitration, IBA Guidelines for Drafting International Arbitration Clauses, and IBA Principles on Conduct for the Legal Profession (2011).

Task forces and action groups
Rule of Law Action Group

Task Force on the Financial Crisis
Task Force on International Terrorism

IBA Outstanding International Woman Lawyer Award
The IBA has an award that is given to an outstanding female lawyer judged to be most deserving of that recognition. It is awarded every other year and is sponsored by LexisNexis. It includes a US$5,000 donation to a charity of the winner’s choice.

Past recipients of the award include the following:

 Helvi Sipilä of Finland in 2001
 Navi Pillay of South Africa in 2003
 Dianna Kempe of Bermuda in 2006
 Anne-Marie Hutchinson of England in 2010
 Olufolake Solanke of Nigeria in  2012
 Tukiya Kankasa-Mabula of Zambia in 2014
Carol Xueref of France in 2016
Eloísa Machado de Almeida of Brazil in 2018

Recent IBA presidents 

2018–2019: Horacio Bernardes Neto, 
2017–2018: Martin Šolc, 
2015–2017: David W. Rivkin, 
2013–2014: Michael Reynolds,  
2011–2012: Akira Kawamura, 
2009–2010: Fernando Pelaez-Pier, 
2007–2008: Fernando Pombo, 
2005–2006: Francis Neate, 
2003–2004: Emilio Cardenas,  
2001–2002: Dianna Kempe, 
1999–2000: Klaus Böhlhoff, 
1997–1998: Desmond Fernando,

References

External links 
 International Bar Association official website

Bar associations
International law organizations
International organisations based in London
Organisations based in the City of London
Organizations established in 1947